Offa (nickname for Wulf) is a semi-legendary king of the Angles in the genealogy of the kings of Mercia presented in the Anglo-Saxon Chronicle. He is the son of Wermund and the father of Angeltheow.
His name is also mentioned in the Old English poem Widsith. He has been identified with Uffo (also Uffe, Uffi of Jutland), a legendary Danish king in the Gesta Danorum by Saxo Grammaticus.

History
The Old English poem Widsith (8th century) refers briefly to his victorious single combat, a story which is related at length by the 12th-century Danish historians Saxo and  Sven Aggesen.

Offa is also mentioned in  the Annales Ryenses, Vita Offae Primi and  Vitae duorum Offarum.

According to Widsith and the Danish sources, Offa successfully conquered the Myrgings, possibly a clan of Saxon origin, and incorporated their land into Angle or Danish lands, by slaying two Myrging princes in single combat and installing himself as their king.

It is possible that the Offa mentioned in Beowulf (lines 1949 and 1957) and married to Modþryð, a lady of murderous disposition, is the same person.

Legend

In the narrative of Saxo, Uffi is said to have been dumb or silent during his early years. His aged and blind father, King Wermund believed him to be a simpleton and in order to preserve his son's position as king had him marry the daughter of Freawine (a neighbouring warlord/king) so that Freawine would assist Uffi when he became king.  However, the plans did not come to pass, as Freawine was killed by a  Myrging warlord called Eadgils. Wermund subsequently raised Freawine's sons Ket and Wig as his own.  The two would eventually cause great dishonour to the Angles when they ambushed Eadgils in a forest as he walked alone and slew him.
The surrounding peoples began to mock the Angles, accusing them of cowardice and dishonour. Eventually the neighbouring Saxons decided that Wermund was too weak to resist their requests for him to surrender his kingdom, and they sent their emissaries to Wermund's court.  There they proceeded to mock the blind man, prompting Wermund to challenge their king to a duel — but the king stated that he would not fight a blind man.  It was then that Uffi regained his speech, and revealed that his silence had been caused by the great dishonour involved in Eadgil's death.  He promptly challenged the prince of the Saxons and one of his champions to a duel in order to regain the honour of the Angles.

Uffi's combat took place at Rendsburg on an island in the Eider River at Fifeldore/Monster-Gate, and Uffi succeeded in killing both his opponents.

A somewhat corrupt version of the same story is preserved in the 13th-century Vitae duorum Offarum, where, however, the scene is transferred to England.

References

Literature
 See H. M. Chadwick, Origin of the English Nation (Cambridge, 1907), for references to the original authorities.
Rickert, Edith. "The Old English Offa Saga."  Modern Philology 2 (1904-5): 29-77 (part 1), 321-76 (part 2). PDF available from Internet Archive
Shippey, Tom. "Wicked Queens and Cousin Strategies in Beowulf and Elsewhere." The Heroic Age 5 (2001). Available online

Mythological kings of Denmark
Anglish people
English heroic legends
Anglo-Saxon warriors
Characters in Beowulf